Quercus rubramenta is a species of oak. It is native to the Sierra Madre del Sur of Guerrero and Oaxaca states in southern Mexico.

References

rubramenta
Endemic oaks of Mexico
Flora of the Sierra Madre del Sur
Plants described in 1934
Taxa named by William Trelease